Wesley Wells Horton (born April 16, 1942 in Hartford, Connecticut) is a Connecticut appellate lawyer. He is currently Of Counsel at McElroy, Deutsch, Mulvaney & Carpenter, LLP.  In 2005, he successfully represented the City of New London in Kelo v. New London before the U.S. Supreme Court.

Horton received his B.A. from Harvard College in 1964 and his J.D. from the University of Connecticut School of Law in 1970.  Before entering private practice, he served as a law clerk for Justice Charles House of the Connecticut Supreme Court from 1970 to 1971.  Horton researched and prepared the plaintiffs' position in the landmark school finance case Horton v. Meskill on behalf of his son Barnaby, the lead plaintiff.  Within Connecticut, and prior to Kelo, Horton was known for his groundbreaking win in Sheff v. O'Neill.  In Sheff, Horton successfully persuaded the Connecticut Supreme Court that education was a fundamental right under the Connecticut Constitution and that de facto segregation in schools violated this right.

Horton has authored scholarly books chronicling the history of the Connecticut Supreme Court (2008) and the Connecticut Constitution (2012), the former with the assistance of attorneys Brendon P. Levesque and Jeffrey White.

References

External links
 McElroy, Deutsch, Mulvaney & Carpenter, LLP
 Connecticut State Constitution by Wesley W. Horton
 The History of the Connecticut Supreme Court by Wesley W. Horton

1942 births
People from Hartford, Connecticut
Living people
People from Connecticut
Harvard College alumni
University of Connecticut School of Law alumni
Connecticut lawyers